Klopp is a German surname, from Middle Low German klopper ‘clapper’, ‘bobbin’, ‘hammer’. C.f. Chlodobert

Notable people with the surname include:

Jürgen Klopp (born 1967), German football player and manager
Nico Klopp (1894–1930), Luxembourgian painter
Onno Klopp (1822-1903), German historian
Paul Klopp (born 1957), politician in Ontario, Canada
Reid Klopp (born 1984), USA-born US Virgin Islands soccer player
Stan Klopp (1910–1980), Major League Baseball pitcher

See also
Klopp Castle, in the Upper Middle Rhine Valley
Klop (disambiguation)
Klopp Woodhead - 3 brothers, 1 sister, a mum and a Tom

References

German-language surnames